Bridge cameras are cameras that fill the niche between relatively simple point-and-shoot cameras and interchangeable-lens cameras such as mirrorless cameras and single-lens reflex cameras (SLRs).  They are often comparable in size and weight to the smallest digital SLRs (DSLR), but lack interchangeable lenses, and almost all digital bridge cameras lack an optical viewfinder system. The phrase "bridge camera" has been in use at least since the 1980s, and continues to be used with digital cameras.  The term was originally used to refer to film cameras which "bridged the gap" between point-and-shoot cameras and SLRs.

Like other cameras, most current bridge cameras are digital.  These cameras typically feature full manual controls over shutter speed, aperture, ISO sensitivity, color balance and metering. Generally, their feature sets are similar to consumer DSLRs, except for a smaller range of ISO sensitivity because of their typically smaller image sensor.  Many bridge cameras have long zoom lenses which now often start at a super wide-angle focal length of 20 or 22mm equivalent focal length (in 35mm film camera terms), so the term "bridge camera" is sometimes used interchangeably with "megazoom", "superzoom", or "ultrazoom."  However, some bridge cameras have only moderate or short zooms (such as the Canon Powershot G9), while many compact cameras have superzoom lenses but lack the advanced functions of a bridge camera.

With zoom ranges and sales rapidly increasing in the early 21st century, every major camera manufacturer has at least one 'super zoom' in its lineup.

One fixed but versatile lens 

Bridge cameras typically have small image sensors, allowing their lenses also to be smaller than a 35mm or APS-C SLR lens covering the same zoom range. As a result, very large zoom ranges (from wide-angle to telephoto, including macro) are feasible with one lens.  The typical bridge camera has a telephoto zoom limit of over 400mm (35mm equivalent), although some 21st-century cameras reach up to 2000mm. For this reason, bridge cameras typically fall into the category of superzoom cameras.

The 24× Zoom Nikkor ED 4.6-110.4mm f2.8-5.0 on the Nikon Coolpix P90, which in 35 mm equivalent focal length terms is a 26-624mm.

LCDs and EVFs as principal viewfinders 

Bridge cameras employ two types of electronic screens as viewfinders: The LCD and the electronic viewfinder (EVF). All bridge cameras have an LCD with live-preview and usually in addition either an EVF or an optical viewfinder (OVF) (non-parallax-free, as opposed to the OVF of DSLRs, which is parallax-free). A high-quality EVF is one of the advanced features that distinguish bridge cameras from consumer compact cameras.

All DSLRs, by definition, have a through-the-lens OVF. Newer DSLR models typically also allow 'live view' on the LCD screen as an alternative to the OVF, although frequently without autofocus or with very slow autofocus. Mirrorless cameras and dSLRs use LCD or electronic viewfinders.

Large-sensor bridge cameras
Just as in compact cameras, there is a trend towards larger sensors in bridge cameras, as well. Sony started the category of 1 inch sensor equipped bridge cameras in 2012 with the Sony Cyber-shot DSC-RX100, followed in late 2013 with the release of the Sony RX10. In 2014, Panasonic followed this with the FZ1000, which has a larger zoom range, up to 400mm equivalent (Sony's RX10 goes to 200mm equivalent). In contrast with the RX10's constant f/2.8 widest aperture Zeiss lens, the Panasonic FZ1000 has a variable f/2.8 to f/4 Leica creation. Sony's DSC-R1 issued as early as 2005 has a 10Mp APS-sized sensor combined with a Zeiss zoom lens. 
In terms of image quality, these cameras are comparable to Canon's DSLRs and similarly priced.

Market 
In late 2012, Techradar wrote that while the general compact camera market was on a downturn, the DSLR-like bridge camera market was continuing well. In 2014, CNET mentioned that for the last couple of years, Fujifilm focused on producing rugged compact cameras and bridge cameras as those segments continue to show strong sales.

References 

 
Live-preview digital cameras
Digital cameras